Waldorf University is a private for-profit university in Forest City, Iowa. It was founded in 1903 and associated with the Evangelical Lutheran Church in America and its predecessors. In 2010, it was sold to Columbia Southern University and became a for-profit institution; 12 years later, ownership was transferred to the Waldorf Lutheran College Foundation.

History 
Waldorf University, founded in 1903 as Waldorf College, was a result of "The Great Hotel War of Forest City", a competitive battle between Forest City's two upper-class hotels, which were built at the same time. The result was the Waldorf Hotel being left vacant after only four months of operation. The vacant hotel provided an opportunity for Rev. C.S. Salveson to create a Christian college. Waldorf started out as an academy and business college, not just a preparatory program for future pastors. From its earliest days, Waldorf viewed education sponsored by the church as essential for success in society.

Since 1920, Waldorf's curriculum has evolved to reflect a liberal arts emphasis. Today almost all Waldorf students intend to earn a bachelor's degree. In the spring of 1994, Waldorf College was accredited by the North Central Association of Colleges and Schools. In January 2010, the Evangelical Lutheran Church in America sold the college to a subsidiary of Columbia Southern University and it became a for-profit institution. Waldorf College became Waldorf University in March 2016. In 2022, the ownership of the college was transferred to the Waldorf Lutheran College Foundation and the university began the process of returning to nonprofit status.

Academics 
Waldorf University offers associate, bachelor, and master's degree programs, as well as several undergraduate certificate options and online career-prep programs. It is accredited by the Higher Learning Commission (HLC).

Undergraduate admissions 
According to the 2019 U.S. News & World Report, Waldorf University is considered "less selective" and had an admissions acceptance rate of 72%. Peterson's - The Real Guide to Colleges and Universities ranked Waldorf College admission as being moderately difficult.

Honor societies 
Waldorf University is home to Iowa Iota, Chapter 364 of Region IV of the Alpha Chi National College Honor Society. Alpha Chi is a national college honor society that admits, by invitation, college juniors, seniors and graduate students in any academic discipline who are in the top 10% of their class.

Waldorf University Theatre is home to the Alpha Epsilon Omega cast of Alpha Psi Omega National Theatre Honor Society (APO). Waldorf University is also an active member in the Kennedy Center American College Theatre Festival.

The university is also home to the Alpha Iota Lambda chapter of the Alpha Sigma Lambda, the is the oldest and largest national honor society for non-traditional students.

Athletics 
Waldorf's athletic teams are called the Warriors. The university is a member of the National Association of Intercollegiate Athletics (NAIA), primarily competing in the North Star Athletic Association (NSAA) since the 2015–16 academic year. The Warriors previously competed in these defunct conferences: the Midlands Collegiate Athletic Conference (MCAC) from 2012–13 to 2014–15; and the Midwest Collegiate Conference (MCC) from 2003–04 to 2011–12.

Waldorf competes in 22 intercollegiate varsity sports. Men's sports include baseball, basketball, bowling, cross country, football, golf, ice hockey, soccer, track & field and wrestling; women's sports include basketball, bowling, cross country, golf, soccer, softball, track & field, volleyball and wrestling; and co-ed sports include cheerleading, eSports and shooting sports. The university expanded athletics in 2010 by adding men's ice hockey and women's wrestling.

Football
The Waldorf Warriors football team represents the university in college football.

Men's soccer
The Waldorf Warriors men's soccer team represents the university in college soccer. It won the Association of Independence Institutions (AII) conference championship, beating Georgia Gwinnett College in 2017 to claim its first conference title in the sport.

Cheerleading
The Waldorf Warriors cheerleaders are a competitive squad known for all-female stunting routines.

Ice hockey
The ice hockey team began play during the 2011–12 academic year and plays an independent schedule of club programs, as the NAIA does not currently sponsor a championship for ice hockey. The program is coached by Brett Shelanski, former head coach of the Minnesota Flying Aces junior A team.

Women's wrestling
Waldorf launched Iowa's first collegiate women's wrestling program in 2010.

Notable alumni

 Brad Anderson, CEO of Best Buy; received his A.A. from Waldorf College in 1969
 Bob Backlund, former professional wrestler; twice wrestling All-American
 Ian Beckles, football player in the NFL
 Greg Davids, Republican member of the Minnesota House of Representatives
 Rebecca Fjelland Davis, novelist and college instructor
 Karl Dehesa, professional basketball player in the Philippine Basketball Association
 Josh Neer, wrestler; current mixed martial artist, formerly for the Ultimate Fighting Championship
 Henry Waechter, former American football defensive lineman in the National Football League for the Chicago Bears, Baltimore/Indianapolis Colts, and Washington Redskins

References

External links
 
 Waldorf athletics website

 
Liberal arts colleges in Iowa
Educational institutions established in 1903
Education in Winnebago County, Iowa
Buildings and structures in Winnebago County, Iowa
1903 establishments in Iowa
Private universities and colleges in Iowa